Pabstiella aurantiaca is a species of orchid plant.

References 

aurantiaca
Plants described in 2011